The year 1709 in music involved some significant events.

Events
Johann Georg Pisendel leaves his post in the court orchestra of Ansbach to travel to Leipzig, meeting Johann Sebastian Bach en route.
Antonio Stradivari makes the Viotti Stradivarius.

Published popular music
"Marlbrough s'en va-t-en guerre"

Classical music 
William Babell – The Third Book of the Ladys Entertainment
Johann Sebastian Bach
Alla breve in D major, BWV 589
Prelude and Fugue in A minor, BWV 895
Fugue in A major on a Theme by Tomaso Albinoni, BWV 950 (approximate date)
Giovanni Battista Bassani – Acroama missale
Antonio Maria Bononcini – La decollazione di S. Giovanni Batista
Juan Cabanilles – Flores de Música
Antonio Caldara – Il nome più glorioso
Louis-Antoine Dornel – Livre de simphonies contenant six suites en trio avec une sonate en quatuor, Op. 1
Francesco Nicola Fago – Il Faraone Sommerso
Francesco Gasparini – L'Oracolo del Fato
Christoph Graupner
Die Krankheit so mich drückt, GWV 1155/09b
Siehe selig ist der Mensch, GWV 1162/09
Diese Zeit ist ein Spiel der Eitelkeit, GWV 1165/09
(see List of cantatas by Christoph Graupner)
 George Frideric Handel
 Irene, idolo mio, HWV 120b
 Lungi da me, pensier tiranno, HWV 125b
 Lungi da voi, che siete poli, HWV 126c
 Mi palpita il cor, HWV 132
 Pensieri notturni di Filli, HWV 134
 Solitudini care, amata libertà, HWV 163
Francesco Onofrio Manfredini – 12 Sinfonie da chiesa, Op.2
Michel Montéclair – Cantata: La Mort de Didon
 – Pièces de violle, Livre 1
James Paisible - The Royal Portuguez. Mr. Isaac's new dance made for Her Majesty's Birthday 1709...
Johann Christoph Pepusch – 6 Recorder Sonatas, Op.2a
Giovanni Battista Reali – 10 Trio Sonatas, Op.1
Agostino Steffani – Amor vien dal destino (Il turno)
Giuseppe Torelli – Concerti Grossi, Op. 8: no 6 in G minor "Christmas Concerto", published posthumously
Antonio Vivaldi – 12 Violin Sonatas, Op.2
Jan Dismas Zelenka – Immisit Dominus pestilentiam, ZWV 58

Opera
Emanuele d'Astorga – Dafne
Michele Falco – Lo Lollo pisciaportelle
George Frideric Handel – Agrippina HWV 6
Marin Marais – Sémélé
Giuseppe Maria Orlandini – L'odio e l'amore
Agostino Steffani – Tassilone

Births 
January 1 – Johann Heinrich Hartmann Bätz, organ builder (died 1770)
January 24 – Dom Bédos de Celles, Benedictine monk and pipe organ builder (died 1779)
February 16 (baptised) – Charles Avison, composer and organist (died 1770)
March 27 – William Flackton, viola player and composer (died 1798)
April 14 – Charles Collé, songwriter and dramatist (died 1783)
June 25 – Francesco Araja, composer (died 1762–1770)
August 8 – Hermann Anton Gelinek, monk and musician (died 1779)
October 25 – Georg Gebel (the younger), composer (died 1753)
November 22 – Franz Benda, violinist and composer (died 1786)
December 1 – František Xaver Richter, composer (died 1789)
date unknown – Christoph Schaffrath, composer (died 1763)
probable – Richard Charke, violinist, composer, operatic baritone, and playwright (died c. 1738)

Deaths 
February 8 – Giuseppe Torelli, violinist and composer (born 1658)
July 17 – Pascal Collasse, composer (baptized 1649)
date unknown
Cristofaro Caresana, operatic tenor, organist and composer (born c.1640)
Giovanni Grancino, luthier (born 1637)

 
18th century in music
Music by year